No is a 2012 historical drama film directed by Pablo Larraín. The film is based on the unpublished stage play El Plebiscito written by Antonio Skármeta. Mexican actor Gael García Bernal plays René, an in-demand advertising man working in Chile in the late 1980s. The film captures the advertising tactics in the political campaigns for the 1988 plebiscite, when the Chilean citizenry decided whether or not dictator Augusto Pinochet should stay in power for another eight years. At the 85th Academy Awards the film was nominated for the Best Foreign Language Film Oscar.

Plot
After fifteen years of military dictatorship and under significant international pressure, the Chilean regime calls for a national plebiscite in 1988 to determine whether General Augusto Pinochet should remain in power for another eight years or whether there should be an open democratic presidential election the following year. René Saavedra, a successful advertising creator, is approached by the "No" campaign to consult on their advertising. Despite his politically conservative boss's disapproval, Saavedra agrees to participate and discovers that the advertising is a depressing catalogue of the regime's abuses, created by an organization lacking confidence in its efforts. Saavedra proposes a lighthearted, optimistic approach that emphasizes abstract concepts like "joy" to counter fears that voting in a referendum under a notoriously brutal military junta would be politically meaningless and risky.

While some members of the "No" campaign dismiss the unorthodox marketing theme as a facile dismissal of the regime's horrific abuses, the proposal is approved. Saavedra, his son, and his colleagues are eventually targeted and intimidated by the authorities. When Saavedra's boss, Lucho, discovers his employee's activities, he offers him a partnership if he withdraws, but Saavedra refuses. As a result, Lucho heads the "Yes" campaign to survive.

The historic campaign unfolds in 27 nights of television advertisements, with each side having 15 minutes per night to present its perspective. During that month, the "No" campaign, led by the majority of Chile's artistic community, proves successful with a series of entertaining and insightful presentations that have cross-demographic appeal. By contrast, the "Yes" campaign's advertising, with only dry economic data in its favor and few creative personnel on call, is criticized even by government officials as crude and heavy-handed.

Despite attempts by the government to interfere with the "No" campaign through further intimidation and blatant censorship, Saavedra and his team use those tactics to their advantage in their marketing, and public sympathy shifts to them. As the campaign heats up in the concluding days with international Hollywood celebrity endorsements and wildly popular street concert rallies of the "No" campaign, the "Yes" side is reduced to desperately mimicking the "No" ads.

On the day of the referendum, it initially appears that the "Yes" vote has the lead, but the final result decisively favors the "No" campaign. The ultimate confirmation comes when the troops surrounding the "No" headquarters withdraw as news arrives that the Chilean senior military command has forced Pinochet to concede. Following their triumph, Saavedra and Lucho resume their usual advertising activities in a new Chile.

The film concludes with historical footage of Pinochet handing over power to newly elected president Patricio Aylwin.

Cast
 Gael García Bernal as René Saavedra
 Alfredo Castro as Luis "Lucho" Guzmán
 Luis Gnecco as José Tomás Urrutia
 Antonia Zegers as Verónica Carvajal
 Marcial Tagle as Costa
 Néstor Cantillana as Fernando Arancibia
 Jaime Vadell as Sergio Fernández
 Pascal Montero as Simón Saavedra
 Diego Muñoz as Carlos
 Paloma Moreno as Francisca
 Sergio Hernández
 Alejandro Goic as Ricardo
 Richard Dreyfuss, Jane Fonda, Christopher Reeve, and Augusto Pinochet as themselves in archive footage
 Patricio Aylwin, Patricio Bañados, Carlos Caszely and Florcita Motuda acting as themselves and also appearing in archival footage

Release
At the Telluride Film Festival, the film was shown outdoors and was rained on. It was also screened at the Locarno Film Festival in Switzerland. No played as a Spotlight selection at the Sundance Film Festival. Gael García Bernal attended the Toronto International Film Festival where No was screened. The film was released in the UK by Network on 8 February 2013.

Reception

International praise
Review aggregation website Rotten Tomatoes gives the film a 93% rating based on 132 reviews, and an average rating of 7.70/10. The website's critical consensus states, "No uses its history-driven storyline to offer a bit of smart, darkly funny perspective on modern democracy and human nature". It also has a score of 81 out of 100 on Metacritic, based on 36 critics, indicating "universal acclaim".

Writing in May 2012, Time Out New York critic David Fear called No "the closest thing to a masterpiece that I've seen so far here in Cannes". Variety reviewer Leslie Felperin felt the film had the "potential to break out of the usual ghettos that keep Latin American cinema walled off from non-Hispanic territories. ....with the international success of Mad Men, marketing campaigners should think about capitalizing on viewers’ fascination everywhere with portraits of the advertising industry itself, engagingly scrutinized here with a delicious, Matthew Weiner-style eye for period detail."

One of the unique features of the film was Larraín's decision to use ¾ inch Sony U-matic magnetic tape, which was widely used by television news in the 80s. The Hollywood Reporter argues that this decision probably lessened the film's chances "commercially and with Oscar voters."  The Village Voice reviewer commented that the film "allows Larrain's new material to mesh quite seamlessly with c. 1988 footage of actual police crackdowns and pro-democracy assemblages, an accomplishment in cinematic verisimilitude situated anxiously at the halfway point between Medium Cool and Forrest Gump."

Criticism at home
The film received mixed reviews in Chile. Several commentators, including Genaro Arriagada, who directed the "No" campaign, accused the film of simplifying history and in particular of focusing exclusively on the television advertising campaign, ignoring the crucial role that a grassroots voter registration effort played in getting out the "No" vote. Larraín defended the film as art rather than documentary, saying that "a movie is not a testament. It’s just the way we looked at it."

In another criticism, a Chilean political science professor asked if one should really celebrate the moment that political activism turned into marketing, rather than a discussion of principles.

Accolades
 
When screened  at the 2012 Cannes Film Festival, No won the Art Cinema Award, the top prize in the Directors' Fortnight section. In September 2012, it was selected as Chile's bid for the Foreign Language Oscar at the 85th Academy Awards. In December 2012 it made the January shortlist and was nominated on 10 January 2013. At the 2012 Abu Dhabi Film Festival, Bernal won the award for Best Actor.

See also
 List of submissions to the 85th Academy Awards for Best Foreign Language Film
 List of Chilean submissions for the Academy Award for Best Foreign Language Film
 Cinema of Chile

References

External links
 
  
 
 

2012 films
2012 drama films
2010s Spanish-language films
French drama films
Films directed by Pablo Larraín
Films about the Chilean military dictatorship
Films set in 1988
Films set in Chile
Drama films based on actual events
Referendums in Chile
Films about elections
French films based on plays
Participant (company) films
American films based on plays
Sony Pictures Classics films
Chilean drama films
Chilean historical films
American political drama films
French political drama films
Films about advertising
2010s American films
2010s French films